Żurrieq Football Club is a Maltese football club based in Żurrieq, Malta. The club currently plays in the Maltese Challenge League. They also play in the annual Maltese FA Trophy.

European History

In 1982, Żurrieq F.C. took part in the first round of the 1982–83 UEFA Cup. Their debut was against HNK Hajduk Split, losing 4–1 and 4–0. Three years later they played the first round in the 1985–86 European Cup Winners' Cup against FC Bayer Uerdingen 05, losing 3–0 and 9–0. The next year they played in the first round of the 1986–87 European Cup Winners' Cup against Wrexham, losing 3–0 and 4–0.

Honours

Domestic
 Maltese FA Trophy (Malta Cup)
 Winners (1) 1985
 Runners-up (2) 1984, 1986
 Maltese Third Division
 Winners (1): 2019
National Amateur League
Winners (1): 2022

Players

Current squad

Current board

Żurrieq F.C. Committee

Statistics

Domestic
The season-by-season performance of the club over the last ten years:

Europe

External links
Official website

References 

 
Association football clubs established in 1949
Football clubs in Malta
1949 establishments in Malta